Sir John Powell (1632 or 1633 – 7 September 1696) was a Welsh judge on the Court of Common Pleas and the Court of King's Bench. He presided over the trial of the Seven Bishops in 1688.

Born in 1632 or 1633, Powell was from Pentre Meurig, Llanwrda in Carmarthenshire, Wales.  He became a member of Gray's Inn in 1650, and matriculated at Jesus College, Oxford. He obtained his Bachelor of Arts degree in 1653 and his Master of Arts degree from King's College, Cambridge in the following year. He was called to the bar in 1657. Details of his legal practice are unknown until his rapid promotion in April 1686, when he became a serjeant-at-law and was then appointed as a judge of the Court of Common Pleas and knighted.  He was soon asked his opinion of the decision in Godden v Hales that the king could dispense with compliance with Acts of Parliament, and he agreed with the majority view that this was permitted.

He was transferred to the Court of King's Bench in 1687. In that court, he was one of the judges who imposed a fine of £30,000 upon the Earl of Devonshire, and was the presiding judge at the trial of the Seven Bishops for seditious libel. At this trial, he was opposed to the king's power to suspend laws in ecclesiastical matters, taking the view that there would be no parliament if this was allowed. As a result, he was sidelined after the trial ended in July 1688, returning to the post of a judge of the Court of Common Pleas in 1689 after the Glorious Revolution. He was summonsed to the House of Lords to explain the fine imposed on the Earl of Devonshire, which was said to be a violation of the principles of Magna Carta and of the privileges of the peers. He asked the pardon of the House, saying that he had been misled by some books that he looked upon as authorities.

Powell built and lived at Broadway Mansion in Laugharne  and died in Exeter on 7 September 1696. There is a memorial tablet in St Martin's Church, Laugharne where he was buried  and which some biographers believe was his place of birth. His son Sir Thomas (1664-1720), of Broadway, Carmarthenshire and Coldbrook, Monmouthshire, was attorney-general of the Carmarthen circuit, 1695–1715, Member of Parliament for Monmouth, 1705–8, and for Carmarthenshire, 1710–15. He was created a baronet in 1698, but the title became extinct on the death of his son Herbert in 1721.

References

1630s births
1696 deaths
Welsh barristers
Serjeants-at-law (England)
People from Carmarthenshire
Members of Gray's Inn
Alumni of Jesus College, Oxford
Alumni of King's College, Cambridge
Justices of the Common Pleas
Justices of the King's Bench
17th-century Welsh lawyers
17th-century Welsh judges